A workout is a session in which physical exercise is performed.

Work out or workout may also refer to:

Art, entertainment, and media

Music

Albums
Workout (album), by Hank Mobley
Workout, by Hal Kemp

Songs
"Workout" (RuPaul song), a song by RuPaul, Brett Henrichsen 2004
"Workout (Fight Scene)", Lee Adams / Charles Strouse 1964 Sammy Davis, Jr. / Original Broadway Cast Golden Boy [Original Broadway Cast]
"Workout", song by Alan Caddy  –	1964
"Workout", by Cerrone from album Cerrone IX: Your Love Survived 1982
"Workout", song by Desmond Dekker  Dacres	1980
"Workout", song by Kojo J. Pembroke Finland 1980
"Workout", by David Michael Frank
"Workout", sketch by Alex Nussbaum
"Workout", by Sundown Park composed by Mickey Simmonds
"Workout", by Bud Da'don and The Smoke
"Workout", by Robert Ward composed by Robert Ward
"Workout", by David Uosikkinen's in the Pocket, composed by Tommy Conwell
"Haunting / Workout", a 2013 song by Andy C

Work Out 
"Work Out" (song), by J. Cole
"Work Out", song by Baby Washington Baby Washington	1959
"Work Out", song by The Flintstones Clark 1964
"Work Out", song by The Journeymen [Surf]  The Journeymen	1961
"Work Out", song by Mongo Santamaría M. Santamaria, W. Bruno, R. Marks	1969
"Work Out", by Red Rider Composed by Tom Cochrane Neruda
"Work Out", sketch by Peter Cook and Dudley Moore from The Comic Genius of Peter Cook and Dudley Moore
"Work Out", by Yellowman Composed by Winston Foster New York
"Work Out", by Mighty Diamonds Planet Earth/Planet Mars Dub

Television
Work Out, a reality television series
Work Out New York, a reality television series

Finance
Workout (finance), an out-of-court debt restructuring

See also 
Exercise (disambiguation)